Donald Snyder Savidge (August 28, 1908 – March 22, 1983) was a pitcher in Major League Baseball. He played for the Washington Senators in 1929. His father, Ralph Savidge, was also an MLB pitcher.

References

External links

1908 births
1983 deaths
People from Columbia County, Pennsylvania
Sportspeople from Santa Barbara, California
Major League Baseball pitchers
Washington Senators (1901–1960) players
Albright Lions baseball players
Baseball players from Pennsylvania